Wells Fargo Tower (also known as Norwest Tower and Robert Driscoll Hotel) is a 20-story high-rise office building located at 615 North Upper Broadway Street in the city of Corpus Christi, Texas, United States. At the time of its completion in 1942, it was the tallest building in the city, and remained so for several decades. The building open on May 25, 1942, and it was built by Clara Driscoll and named after her father Robert Driscoll.

See also 
 List of tallest buildings in Corpus Christi

References 

Office buildings completed in 1942
Buildings and structures in Corpus Christi, Texas
Wells Fargo buildings
Skyscraper office buildings in Texas
1942 establishments in Texas